The Roberts Mountains are located in central Nevada in the western United States. The mountains are found in Eureka County, east of the Simpson Park Mountains and west and southwest of the Sulphur Spring Range.

Roberts Mountains was named after Bolivar Roberts, a division superintendent of the Pony Expressl.

Geology
The range contains rocks deformed by the Antler orogeny of Late Devonian to early Mississippian age. Along the Roberts Mountain thrust fault, which was named for the range, a terrane of oceanic island arc volcanic rocks and sediments were emplaced over the pre-existing Devonian to Silurian carbonates, sandstones and shales of the coastal margin of the continent.

Ecology
The Bureau of Land Management manages 99.4% of the Roberts Mountains, and 0.6% is privately held.  Mammals found in the range include: the long-tailed vole, Great Basin pocket mouse, water shrew, and the big jumping mouse.  The large spotted leopard lizard can also be found in the mountains.

Trees found in the range include: western juniper (Juniperus occidentalis), Utah juniper (Juniperus osteosperma), and single-leaf pinyon (Pinus monophylla).

References

 

Mountain ranges of Nevada
Mountain ranges of Eureka County, Nevada